Reading Township is one of sixteen townships in Calhoun County, Iowa, United States.  As of the 2000 census, its population was 588.

History
Reading Township was created in 1875. It was named for Charles H. Reading, a pioneer settler.

Geography
According to the USGS, it contains two cemeteries: Reading and Saint Joseph.

References

External links
 City-Data.com

Townships in Calhoun County, Iowa
Townships in Iowa